Zoltán Kelemen (born 4 October 1958) is a retired Hungarian gymnast. He competed at the 1980 Summer Olympics in all artistic gymnastics events and won a bronze medal with the Hungarian team. Individually his best achievement was 19th place in the pommel horse.

References

1958 births
Living people
Hungarian male artistic gymnasts
Gymnasts at the 1980 Summer Olympics
Olympic gymnasts of Hungary
Olympic bronze medalists for Hungary
Olympic medalists in gymnastics
Medalists at the 1980 Summer Olympics
Gymnasts from Budapest
20th-century Hungarian people